Highway 2000 is a 1981 board game published by Threshold Games.

Gameplay
Highway 2000 is a game of combat on the highways of the near future, in which each player chooses and arms one or more vehicles.

Reception
Tom Gordon reviewed Highway 2000 in The Space Gamer No. 53. Gordon commented that "I feel that if rules for expanded movement and 'off-road' scenarios had been included, then Highway 2000 might have lived up to its [...] price tag.  In its present condition it just doesn't have enough substance for [that price].  Unless you have dollars to burn, I would not recommend purchasing this game."

References

Board games introduced in 1981